Worsleya is a genus of Brazilian plants in the Amaryllis family, cultivated as an ornamental because of its showy flowers. There is only one known species, Worsleya procera, native to eastern Brazil. Here the sickle-shaped  leaves curve northward. When grown in the northern hemisphere, the leaves curve southward. It is one of the largest (around 1.5 meters high) and rarest members of the subfamily Amaryllidoideae (family Amaryllidaceae).

This species is also known as the Empress of Brazil because of its origin in South America and in reference to the wife of Emperor Dom Pedro.  It grows in very extreme and moist environments, and is commonly found near waterfalls in rich soil situated on granite rocks (which is why it is sometimes considered to be a lithophyte) and sunny places. However, it can be difficult to cultivate. It has plenty of needs, though it can exhibit great hardiness. It also has many ornamental traits.

Description 
The plant has a large bulb that produces a high stem with green recurved leaves. Worsleya produces spectacular and beautiful blooms. They are large, lilac to blue, with small freckles on them.

References

Amaryllidoideae
Amaryllidaceae genera
Monotypic Asparagales genera
Endemic flora of Brazil
Critically endangered plants